The Hominy Armory is a single story building measuring 257 feet x 141 feet.  It was constructed between 1935 and 1937 by the Works Progress Administration.  It originally housed the Hominy National Guard.

References

Buildings and structures in Osage County, Oklahoma
Armories on the National Register of Historic Places in Oklahoma
Hominy, Oklahoma
National Register of Historic Places in Osage County, Oklahoma